"STFU!" (an abbreviation for "shut the fuck up") is a song by Japanese-British singer-songwriter Rina Sawayama. It was released as the lead single from her debut studio album, Sawayama on 22 November 2019 for digital download and streaming. It is a nu metal, heavy metal, hard rock, pop and avant-pop track which criticizes microaggressions against Asian people. It received positive reviews from music critics, who praised its aggressive tone and the shift in genre and direction. Rolling Stone listed "STFU!" as the 20th best song of 2020.

Background 
According to Sawayama, the track was inspired by "early 2000s pop-rock and nu-metal; [...] No Doubt, Limp Bizkit, t.A.T.u. and Evanescence". She also added that she "was really itching to do something that was inspired by like N.E.R.D. or Evanescence or like t.A.T.u., or some of the heavier Britney stuff" and that her goal with the track was to "shock people because [she]'d been away for a while"

Composition and lyrical themes 
"STFU!" was noted by critics as a departure from the 2000s-inspired pop and R&B sound of Sawayama's previous works. Sonically, it's an "aggressive", "riotous" blend of nu metal, heavy metal, hard rock, "sugary" pop and avant-pop with instrumentation consisting of "screeching", "frantic" guitars, "thrashing" drums, and a "headbanging" beat. According to Rolling Stones Rob Sheffield, it combines "two totally different strains of Y2K-era radio — Britney-Backstreet teen disco and Korn-esque nu metal". Lyrically, it is a "riposte to racism" which "confronts the fetishized stereotypes Asian women are subjected to everyday".

Music video

Release and synopsis 
The music video for the song premiered on 21 November 2019. Directed by Sawayama and Alesandra "Ali" Kurr, it was inspired by the artist's experiences with stereotypes of Asian people. It begins with Sawayama on a date with a man (played by British comedian Ben Ashenden) having a conversation. The man asks Sawayama numerous questions, including whether or not she had visited the Wagamama restaurant at Heathrow Airport, why she sings in English and doesn't make J-pop music, as well as compares her to Sandra Oh and Lucy Liu and reveals that he's working on a "new-age Memoirs of a Geisha".

Release history

References 

Rina Sawayama songs
2019 songs
2019 singles
Dirty Hit singles
Nu metal songs
Heavy metal songs
Avant-pop songs
Songs written by Rina Sawayama
Songs against racism and xenophobia